The Battle of Brissarthe was fought on 2 July 866,  between the Franks and a joint Breton-Viking army near Brissarthe, Neustria. It was marked by the death of Robert the Strong, the Neustrian margrave, and Ranulf I, the duke of Aquitaine. 

In 866, Salomon, Duke of Brittany, allied with Hastein (Hasting), a Danish chieftain, for an expedition into Anjou, Maine, and Touraine. In the course of the campaign, Le Mans was sacked. Robert, commander of the afflicted regions, assembled a large army to expel them. He was joined by Ranulf of the region of Poitou and by Gauzfrid and Hervé of Maine. 

The Frankish army succeeded in intercepting the Danes before they reached their boats on the river Loire. The Danes attempted to take refuge in a church, but the Franks besieged them. During the night, the Danes attempted to escape. During the ensuing battle, Robert was killed, Ranulf mortally wounded by an arrow, and Hervé injured. With the loss of their leaders, the Franks had to retreat. 

In 867, Charles the Bald entered negotiations with Salomon and recognised him as King of Brittany.  He conceded the Cotentin and possibly the Avranchin to the Bretons. Hastein continued to ravage the Loire Valley for many more years. He and his forces attacked Bourges in 867, Orléans in 868, and Angers in 872. Charles appealed for assistance to Salomon.

Primary sources 
Annales Bertiniani

References 

860s conflicts
Battles involving the Vikings
Battles involving France
866
9th century in West Francia
Viking Age in France
Brissarthe
Battles in Pays de la Loire
History of Maine-et-Loire